Al Mudhafr Al-Alla is a sub-district located in the Al Bayda District, Al Bayda Governorate, Yemen. Al Mudhafr Al-Alla had a population of 5098 according to the 2004 census.

References 

Sub-districts in Al Bayda District